Van Von Hunter is a weekly hand-drawn parody manga began in 2002 by Mike Schwark and Ron Kaulfersch of Pseudomé Studio, based in Cleveland, Ohio. It has been published in newspapers, books, and as a webcomic. The story takes place in the land of Dikay, a country fraught with zombies, and focuses on the warrior Van Von Hunter and his "never-ending fight against evil...stuff". The opening of the series and Von Hunter's presence are reminiscent of the video game seriesCastlevania, but at its core, the comic is a spoof of role-playing games, fantasy creatures, and folklore (in one instance Von Hunter slays an Irish pixie), among other things.

Publication history
In 2003, the webcomic won the first-place trophy at Tokyopop's inaugural Rising Stars of Manga contest, leading three volumes to be published in North America by Tokyopop. The published series features a storyline that takes place after the events of the webcomic.

In the Summer of 2006, Van Von Hunter started a six-month run of Sunday newspapers. It was syndicated by  Universal Press Syndicate, published in approximately 30 papers in North America (and one in Sweden), including the Los Angeles Times, The Denver Post, the Seattle Post-Intelligencer, The Detroit News, The Oregonian, The Vancouver Sun, and the Toronto Sun. Van Von Hunter was the second Tokyopop manga to be syndicated to newspapers, the first being Peach Fuzz by Jared Hodges and Lindsay Cibos.

The comic's anniversary falls on Valentine's Day (February 14), which is jokingly referred to as "Von Hunter Day" on the site (after Van decided that anyone who didn't want to celebrate Valentine's Day should have an alternative).

Characters

Van Von Hunter – The protagonist, Von Hunter is a jovial and easygoing adventurer who is dedicated to battling the forces of evil. He always introduces himself as "Van Von Hunter, mighty warrior and hunter of evil... stuff!" While not particularly bright, Von Hunter makes up for his shortcomings with irrepressible optimism, a strong sense of justice, a certain degree of cunning, and excellent armed-combat skills. His original name was Van Von Vaughn, but he changed it to suit his profession.
Van Von Hunter's sidekick – A young woman whom Von Hunter rescued from Count Disdain. Before being able to introduce herself, she was struck on the head and lost her memory. She tags along with Von Hunter because she has nowhere else to go. This sidekick doesn't do much fighting, but her common sense saves Von Hunter on occasion.
Prince Lesley Mortimer Lamorte – Better known by his own ill-chosen title, the Flaming Prince, Lamorte rules over Dikay Kingdom at the wish of his truly wicked father. He is Van Von Hunter's self-proclaimed sworn nemesis, though is even dimmer than Von Hunter himself. The Flaming Prince, in his vendetta against Von Hunter, employs ghastly minions to dispose of his nemesis, including mummies, skeletons, goblins, and a fearsome Beast.
The Man in the Dark Glasses – The Flaming Prince's right-hand man. He provides the prince with encouragement, thoughtful advice, and random things to crush in his hand. He is secretly the glue that holds the kingdom together.
The Archmage Ariana Rael – An adorable young girl who blew up her village when they tried to feed her to a dragon, she was hired by the Flaming Prince as a secret weapon. When Von Hunter arrived to do battle with the Prince, Ariana was supposed to destroy him with her powerful pyromancy, the Mega-Destruction Flare. Instead, she simply blew up everything surrounding him. "Ari" ended up traveling with our heroes for a time.
Vengeance Joe – An easily-angered antagonist with no known past. His defining feature is that once he is angered, nothing can stop him from finding his revenge. His list of enemies is long and varied, ranging from a staircase (for tripping him) to a tree (for getting in his way) to even the blissfully ignorant Von Hunter (for not introducing himself as they passed each other on the street). He is now questing to carry out his vengeance on Von Hunter by destroying all that the righteous warrior cares for. He is allergic to walnuts.

Monsters
There are many types of monsters in Von Hunter's world, though not all are very fearsome.
Zombies – Zombies seem to get appointed for the jobs that no one else wants in Von Hunter's world, from lawyers to accountants. They also display lower than average intelligence which makes them more harmful than useful. Wanted posters in zombie-infested woods can be seen as "zombie deflectors".
Orcs – Large and dangerous creatures, which comprised a large portion of the Prince's army (before being wiped out by Ari).
Goblins – More cute than deadly, goblins wear hats and outfits that make them resemble Christmas elves. They are by far the most useful of the Prince's forces (despite his apparent dislike for them) as they fill some of the menial chores (such as bartending), can be bizarrely versatile, and were able to restore the kingdom's finances through bake sales. They are talented chefs, and mesmerized Von Hunter's Sidekick with brownies (in the print version).
Mummies – Similar to zombies but less useful as they are wrapped too tightly and can not move very quickly.
The Beast – Supposedly unleashed to kill Von Hunter, this minotaur-like monster, after being locked up for millennia, immediately began hogging a nearby toilet. Soon after he got stuck in a brunch-line, and was later set on fire by a demon, before the Prince's doomsday device turned it into a potted plant. In the book, he had a case of food poisoning.
Vampires – Vampires are undead beings, though not always humans, with fangs and pointed ears. They feed on blood and turn to dust when staked through the heart. Vampires are the rulers of the unnamed country where the webcomic opens.
Ghouls – Ghouls are bald, and have pointed ears, fangs and nails. Ghouls eat humans and founded the unnamed country where the webcomic opens.
Trolls – Large and grotesque looking creature seen at a monster's bar.
Leprechaun – Tiny little men with beards and pointed ears.
Dragons – Giant lizard-like creatures with bat-like wings and horns.
Werewolves – People who transform into half-wolf monsters during the full moon.
Sasquatch – A large, hairy, ape-like creature.
Pollywacker – A  monster in the mysterious forest of the accursed valley of the Twelve Severed Heads, who terrorized the Valley until Von Hunter killed it.
Gargoyles – Large winged monsters called "stoners" by the Prince. The Gargoyles of Von Hunter's world behave similar to stereotypical stoner teenagers.
Bugs – The Insects (and most likely arachnids like spiders) are sentient creatures with their own society. They are still just as small, however. Their leader, Lord Chitin, was inadvertently killed by the Flaming Prince early on.
Demons – The only demon seen in the webcomic is a large and ferocious-looking monster, similar in appearance to the Balrog. However, it is comforts the Beast when The Flaming Prince scolds it and is used to serve hot drinks.
Hybrids – To combat Von Hunter, The Flaming Prince had several combinations of monsters created. These were: a goblin-orc creature (a fat goblin), a weresasquatch (a very hairy creature that would get even hairier during the full moon), and a combination of five dragons (a five-headed dragon whose heads attacked one another).

Live-Action Movie
In 2010, Van Von Hunter was adapted as a live-action film directed and written by Steven Calcote and Stuart J. Levy. It stars Yuri Lowenthal, Heather Marie Marsden, and Lucas Bridgeman. It won Levy and Calcote "Best Director" at Mockfest 2011.

Collections
Starting in 2005, Tokyopop published a series of graphic novels set in the Van Von Hunter universe, taking place several years after the conclusion of the webcomic's plot.
 Van Von Hunter volume 1. . TOKYOPOP. 2005-05-10
 Van Von Hunter volume 2. . TOKYOPOP. 2005-09-13
 Van Von Hunter volume 3. . TOKYOPOP. 2006-12-12

Reception
Carlo Santos of Anime News Network stated: "For those who have grown tired of the fantasy genre's ridiculous self-importance and constantly recycled clichés, Van Von Hunter is the antidote, attacking these clichés with irreverent fervor. However, in doing so it becomes something of a cliché itself, relying on a predictable comedic approach and putting its characters in overused situations—not to mention that the whole adventure-comedy thing has been done plenty of times before." Reviewing the webcomic, Dani Atkinson of Sequential Tart stated that the black and white artstyle of Van Von Hunter is initially fairly "crude", but evolved into a more crisp tone as the series continued.

References

External links
 
Van Von Hunter manga at Tokyopop
 Van Von Hunter live-action film at Tokyopop
IMDB entry for the 2010 film website

2000s webcomics
2002 webcomic debuts
Anime and manga inspired webcomics
American comedy webcomics
Fantasy webcomics
Original English-language manga
Tokyopop titles
Webcomics in print